Erin Township may refer to:

Canada 
 Erin, Ontario, formerly Erin Township

United States 
 Erin Township, Stephenson County, Illinois
 Erin Township, Hancock County, Iowa
 Erin Township, Rice County, Minnesota
 Erin Township, Michigan, a former township in Macomb County

Township name disambiguation pages